Jacqueline Martin may refer to:

 Jackie Martin (cyclist) (born 1971), road cyclist from South Africa
 Jacqueline Briggs Martin, American author of children's literature